The 1993 FIBA European League Final Four, or 1993 FIBA EuroLeague Final Four, was the 1992–93 season's FIBA European League Final Four tournament, organized by FIBA Europe.

Limoges CSP won its first title, after defeating Benetton Treviso in the final game. It was the first time a French team was the European champion.

Bracket

Semifinals

Real Madrid Teka – Limoges CSP

PAOK – Benetton Treviso

Third place game

Final

Awards

FIBA European League Final Four MVP 
  Toni Kukoč ( Benetton Treviso)

FIBA European League Finals Top Scorer 
  Terry Teagle ( Benetton Treviso)

FIBA European League All-Final Four Team

References

External links 
 FIBA Europe-European Championship 1992-93
 Athens 1993: a surprise from France (Euroleague.net)
 Linguasport

Final Four
1992–93
1992–93 in Greek basketball
1992–93 in Spanish basketball
1992–93 in Italian basketball
1992–93 in French basketball
International basketball competitions hosted by Greece
Sports competitions in Piraeus